is a passenger railway station located in the city of Hiratsuka, Kanagawa Prefecture, Japan, operated by East Japan Railway Company (JR East).

Lines 
Hiratsuka Station is served by the Tokaido Main Line and also Shonan-Shinjuku Line through services. The station is 63.8 kilometers from the starting point of the Tokaido Main Line at Tokyo Station.

Station layout
The station consists of two island platforms serving four tracks, connected to the station building by a footbridge. The station has a Midori no Madoguchi staffed ticket office. The station building has large shopping complexes to the north and south of the tracks.

Platforms

History

Hiratsuka Station was opened on July 11, 1887, for both freight and passenger service on what was later designated the Tokaido Main Line of Japanese National Railways (JNR). A number of short freight spur lines radiated out from Hiratsuka Station to serve the various industries which were developed in the vicinity of the station. Most of these spur lines were no longer in operation by 1924. The original station building was destroyed by soil liquefaction during the 1923 Great Kantō earthquake, which also brought down the bridge over the nearby Sagami River. The station building was completely rebuilt in June 1973. With the dissolution and privatization of JNR on April 1, 1987, the station came under the control of the East Japan Railway Company.

Passenger statistics
In fiscal 2019, the station was used by an average of 60,941 passengers daily.

The passenger figures for previous years are as shown below.

Surrounding area
 Hiratsuka City Hall
 Hiratsuka Citizen Center
Hiratsuka City Central Public Hall
Hiratsuka City Museum

See also
List of railway stations in Japan

References
Yoshikawa, Fumio. Tokaido-sen 130-nen no ayumi. Grand-Prix Publishing (2002) .

External links

JR East station information 

Railway stations in Kanagawa Prefecture
Railway stations in Japan opened in 1887
Shōnan-Shinjuku Line
Hiratsuka, Kanagawa